Slump Mountain is a peak 0.7 nautical miles (1.3 km) southwest of University Peak, rising to 2,195 m between the heads of University Valley and Farnell Valley in the Quartermain Mountains, Victoria Land. So named by New Zealand Antarctic Place-Names Committee (NZ-APC) following geological work carried out by C.T. McElroy, G. Rose, and K.J. Whitby in the 1980–81 season. The face of the peak exhibits large-scale slump structures in the Metschel Tillite zone.

Mountains of Victoria Land
Scott Coast